Balata Camp  is a Palestinian refugee camp established in the northern West Bank in 1950, adjacent to Balata village on the outskirts of the city of Nablus. It is the largest refugee camp in the West Bank. Balata Camp is densely populated with 30,000 residents in an area of 0.25 square kilometers.

History
In 1950, the UN gave the refugees from the Jaffa area temporary housing. These people initially refused the UN's offers, stating their eagerness to return to their homes. They desired no sense of permanence. After two years, they accepted the offer and settled at Balata. In 1956, the Jaffa refugees desired more permanent housing. After the border with the State of Israel was sealed, the refugees moved into concrete housing that replaced the original tents.

Education and culture
The United Nations Relief and Works Agency for Palestine Refugees in the Near East (UNRWA) funds a school in the Balata camp, with approximately 5,000 pupils.
The Yaffa Cultural Center in Balata operates a guesthouse, children’s theater and cinema, children’s library and media center.  The American NGO, Tomorrow's Youth Organization, also operates classes for children from Balata.

Political violence
In the 1980s and 1990s, Balata residents played a leading role in the uprising known as the First Intifada. In November 2007, Palestinian National Authority police officers climbed rooftops in Balata and engaged in gun battles with militants of the Al-Aqsa Martyrs' Brigades who had turned the camp into a military stronghold. Five residents and a policeman were wounded in the shooting.

Notable people
 Sakher Habash

Gallery

References

External links
 Videos from Balata
 Balata, articles from UNWRA

Populated places established in 1950
Palestinian refugee camps in the West Bank
Nablus Governorate
;